Megachile punctomarginata is a species of bee in the family Megachilidae. It was described by Schulten in 1977.

References

Punctomarginata
Insects described in 1977